AECC University College is a specialist university in Bournemouth that offers undergraduate, postgraduate, and short courses in a range of health sciences disciplines.

These include Chiropractic, Diagnostic and Therapeutic Radiography, Physiotherapy, Sports Rehabilitation, Sport and Exercise Psychology, Clinical Exercise and Rehabilitation, and Sport and Exercise Science.

As a specialist provider, this range of courses sits alongside teaching and clinical facilities based onsite, including a large clinic, MRI, ultrasound, X-ray, and rehabilitation gym. 

The University College operates a large community-based Chiropractic clinic that provides subsidised treatments, supports student placements, and is a base for research and development activities. AECC University College opened a new Integrated Rehabilitation Centre in October 2022. 

AECC University College was founded in September 1965 as the Anglo-European College of Chiropractic, renamed in 1969 to the Anglo-European of Chiropractic (AECC).

History
The Anglo-European College of Chiropractic was established with financial backing of European Chiropractors, supported by the European Chiropractor’s Union (ECU), and recognised by the British Chiropractic Association (BCA). This was the first Chiropractic training programme in Europe and passed its first Chiropractors in 1969. 

The official opening of the AECC at its present location in Boscombe took place on 21 May 1982.

AECC University College went on to offer the first validated degree course in Chiropractic in 1988. It offered the first undergraduate and postgraduate Masters courses in 1997, validated by the University of Portsmouth and accredited by the General Chiropractic Council (GCC) in 2000.

Alongside the University of South Wales and the MC Timoney College of Chiropractic, the former Anglo-European College of Chiropractic is one of only three institutions in the United Kingdom to offer Chiropractic degrees recognised by the General Chiropractic Council.

AECC University College later supported the University of Portsmouth to develop a Professional Doctorate in Chiropractic.

Bournemouth University became the validating partner in 2005, and in 2007-8 new educational provision was validated in related diagnostic and rehabilitation fields of Medical Ultrasound (MSc) and Clinical Exercise Science (BSc delivered in partnership with BU).

AECC University College was granted Taught Degree Awarding Powers in 2017, and registered with the Office for Students (OfS) as a higher education provider in 2018. AECC University College has since begun to further diversify its provision in health sciences-related disciplines in response to workforce gaps identified in Allied Health and related disciplines.

Clinical services 
In 2009 AECC University College opened a new clinic building to support its Clinical Services, consisting of 33 treatment rooms, a suite of tutor rooms, a student study space and a rehabilitation gym. The Clinic treats over 50,000 patient contacts a year.

This is complemented and supported by onsite imaging facilities for patient diagnostics consisting of 10 ultrasound units (in an adjacent building), an open upright MRI scanner (1 of only 7 in the UK), digital X-ray in a separate suite with mock ward facilities, and a rehabilitation gym.

AECC University College’s Human Performance Laboratory supports education in physiological and biomechanical measurement, data analysis and interpretation to support functional assessment, kinematic and kinetic analysis. This underpins motion analysis required across health sciences courses including Chiropractic and Physiotherapy.

AECC University College was awarded £2.7m funding by the Dorset Local Enterprise Partnership (Dorset LEP) in September 2020 towards the building of a new Integrated Rehabilitation Centre facility and to develop a programme of new courses and patient services.

The  £4.5m Integrated Rehabilitation Centre officially opened in October 2022; a treatment facility with 238m2 of multi-zoned rehabilitation space, and an additional nine treatment rooms. AECC University College is working in partnership with a local primary care network and local NHS providers to deliver care and support patients both on and offsite.

Campus facilities 
The University College campus is split into Parkwood Campus and Garnet Campus, located across the road from each other. 

Parkwood Campus consists of the main University College building, Chiropractic Clinic, Cavendish House, and the student Gym. Across the road, Garnet Campus is home to the School of Rehabilitation, Sport and Psychology and the Integrated Rehabilitation Centre. 

Cavendish House 

Cavendish House is home to the School of Radiology. Equipment includes the VERT (Virtual Environment Radiotherapy Treatment) and Samsung and AGFA Clinical rooms.

Toggler's Arms & Spine & Dine Refectory

Student dining/leisure facilities. 

Gym

AECC University College gym has cardio facilities housing spinning bikes, rowing machines and a cross trainer. It also has a well-equipped weights area and climbing wall. The gym is housed within a sports hall which is used for various activities including: netball, hockey, basketball, badminton, handball and football. It also holds various exercise classes through the week.

Library 

The library at AECC University College is situated in what was once the chapel to the convent. The building has original stained-glass windows and high ceilings, and houses over 10,000 books, 14,000+ online journals, medical databases, anatomical and other learning and academic software. The Library offers group study pods, desk space, seating areas and a self-service kiosk.

Pre-university courses
Access to Higher Education Diploma (Health Sciences)
AECC University College offers a Gateway to Higher Education Diploma which is for those seeking access to health related higher education courses (degrees) such as chiropractic, exercise science, community health and rehabilitation, physiotherapy, osteopathy or health sciences. This course is part-time (Friday to Sunday) and covers the range of skills required to progress to further study once completed.

Current undergraduate courses
Master of Chiropractic - MChiro (Hons)
AECC University College offers a 4 - 5 year chiropractic course in a clinical setting.
To qualify as a chiropractor, new students are required to complete successfully the full-time Masters of Chiropractic (Hons) degree.

BSc (Hons) Clinical Exercise and Rehabilitation Science
The AECC University College offer (subject to validation) the BSc (Hons) Clinical Exercise and Rehabilitation Science degree course. New students are required to successfully complete the 3 year full-time degree.

Current postgraduate courses
MSc Medical Ultrasound
The AECC University College offer a part-time 4 year MSc in Medical Ultrasound in a clinical setting.

MSc advanced professional practice (MSc APP)
The AECC University College offer a part-time MSc Advanced Professional Practice, with four separate pathways: Clinical Sciences, Paediatric Musculoskeletal Health, Functional Musculoskeletal Health, Musculoskeletal Neuroscience.

PgCert Professional Development Chiropractic
The AECC University College offer a 1-year Pg Cert for those starting out in their chiropractic career.

Continuing professional development courses
The AECC University College offers a range of continuing professional development courses (CPD Seminars) including short courses and MSc programmes. The courses are offered to many different healthcare professionals including chiropractors, nurses, medical practitioners, osteopaths, physiotherapists, radiographers and exercise scientists.

Short courses in ultrasound
The AECC University College offers a range of short ultrasound courses for healthcare professionals, including: nurses, midwives, chiropractors, physiotherapists, sonographers, radiographers, rheumatologists, sport physicians, GPs, osteopaths, podiatrists, podiatric surgeons, urologists.

Exercise and Sport Performance Centre 
Exercise and Sport Performance Centre

The Exercise Centre houses a range of strengthening and assessment tools. The room houses the following functional assessment equipment:
 Primus – isometric, isotonic and isokinetic assessment and training tool. It can target individual muscle groups or complete functional and sporting movements.
 MCU (multi-cervical unit) – used for neck isometric strength and range of motion testing, as well as for strengthening. 
 Quintic – Biomechanical video analysis software. This has a high speed camera that can be slowed down and watched through a laptop and analysed using Quintic. This machine also has EMG (electromyography), which detects electrical activity in muscles so can be used to analyse muscle recruits and activation levels.

AECC University College hosted the Icelandic Olympic track and field team prior to their participation in the London 2012 Games.
The sport performance centre works with various sporting teams including Southampton FC, AFC Bournemouth, Bournemouth Rugby Football Club and The Seagulls.

References

Chiropractic schools in the United Kingdom
Education in Bournemouth
Buildings and structures in Bournemouth
Educational institutions established in 1965
1965 establishments in England